Aanappaachan is a 1978 Indian Malayalam film,  directed by A. Vincent and produced by Boban Kunchacko. The film stars Prem Nazir, Jayan, Sheela and Adoor Bhasi in the lead roles. The film has musical score by G. Devarajan.

Cast

Prem Nazir as Paachan/Bhaskaran, Gopi (double role)
Jayan as Paramu
Sheela as Sundari
Adoor Bhasi as Beeran Kaakka
Jose as Suresh
Vijayavani as Susheela
Kainakari Thangaraj as Shankaran
Aranmula Ponnamma as Sarojini Amma
G. K. Pillai as Janardhanan B. A.
Mallika Sukumaran as Girly
Master Manohar as Pottan Kutty
Premji as Appu Nair
Reena as Usha

Soundtrack
The music was composed by G. Devarajan and the lyrics were written by P. Bhaskaran.

References

External links
 

1978 films
1970s Malayalam-language films
Films directed by A. Vincent